Warhead Records was an independent record label based in Sydney, Australia that specialised in releasing albums by Australian heavy metal bands. It was formed in 1992 by British migrant Brad Sims and Julie Martin (now Sims) who began by selling demo tapes of local bands at heavy metal shows at Sydney's Lewisham Hotel. In February 1993 Warhead Records released its first recording, the EP Atavism by Sydney doom/death band Cruciform, a group Sims was also managing. This was followed six months later by Neophobia's Fear of the Future. By the beginning of 1996 the label had an extensive roster of Australian bands from across the heavy metal spectrum. Most of its signings were from Sydney, although they included several non-Sydney acts on their label such as Psychrist from Canberra, Manticore from  Wagga Wagga, Misery from Brisbane and Epitaph from Perth. Along with its CD releases, Warhead also acted as a demo distribution service for a number of acts. In 1995 several of these were collected for the compilation album Warhead Records Vol. 1.

Warhead was run in tandem with the Hammerhouse, a CD store in the Sydney suburb of Parramatta which sold underground heavy metal music and other merchandise from around the world. In Your Face magazine also came out in 1993 and lasted for 9 issues, it was resurrected again in 1998 and another four issues were released.

In mid-1999, with several albums still awaiting release, Warhead Records ceased trading. The remaining artists were forced to seek their own avenue of release. The label officially wound up in 2001. The block which had contained the Hammerhouse was demolished in 2005.

Releases

External links
 Warhead Records - Tribute channel on YouTube

Australian record labels
Australian independent record labels
Record labels established in 1992
Record labels disestablished in 2001
Record labels based in Sydney